"King of Everything" is a single by American rapper Wiz Khalifa. It was released on October 16, 2015. The song was produced by ID Labs and Cozmo.

Commercial performance
"King of Everything" debuted at number 45 on the Billboard R&B/Hip-Hop Digital Songs chart, dated on November 7, 2015. and reached number 2 on the Bubbling Under R&B/Hip-Hop chart on November 21.

Charts

References

2015 singles
2015 songs
Wiz Khalifa songs
Songs written by Wiz Khalifa
Atlantic Records singles